Current Medical Science is a bimonthly peer-reviewed general medical journal. It was established in 1981 and is published by Springer Science+Business Media in a partnership with China's Huazhong University of Science and Technology. The editor-in-chief is Jian-guo Chen. According to the Journal Citation Reports, the journal has a 2017 impact factor of 0.948.

References

External links

Springer Science+Business Media academic journals
Publications established in 1981
Bimonthly journals
General medical journals
Multilingual journals